Swan Township is located in Warren County, Illinois, United States. As of the 2010 census, its population was 265 and it contained 126 housing units.

Geography

Demographics

References

External links
City-data.com
Illinois State Archives

Townships in Warren County, Illinois
Townships in Illinois